Cassephyra is a genus of moths in the family Geometridae.

Species
 Cassephyra cyanosticta (Hampson, 1907)
 Cassephyra formosa (Debauche, 1941)
 Cassephyra lamprosticta (Hampson, 1895)
 Cassephyra plenimargo (Warren, 1903)
 Cassephyra triangulifera (Warren, 1898)

References
 Cassephyra at Markku Savela's Lepidoptera and Some Other Life Forms
 Natural History Museum Lepidoptera genus database

Ennominae